Aircastle Limited is an aircraft leasing company that acquires, leases and sells commercial jet aircraft to airlines around the world. It has its headquarters in Stamford, Connecticut, with offices in Dublin and Singapore. Aircastle was incorporated on October 29, 2004.

, Aircastle owns and managed 277 aircraft leased to 87 lessees located in 48 countries.

From August 2006 to March 2020, Aircastle traded on the New York Stock Exchange under the ticker symbol AYR.

The acquisition was completed on March 27, 2020.

References

External links 
Aircastle Ltd

Companies based in Stamford, Connecticut
Companies formerly listed on the New York Stock Exchange
Leasing companies
Marubeni
Mizuho Financial Group